Nicholas Anthony Manabat (2 September 1972 – 5 November 1995) was a Filipino comic book artist, best known for co-creating Cybernary.

Early life
Manabat was born in British Hong Kong. He was raised and educated in Brisbane, Australia from 1983 to 1990.

Career
Manabat co-created Cybernary with writer Steve Gerber in 1992 for Wildstorm Productions. His illustration technique was marked by bold use of blacks in a heavy metal style. Cybernary was launched as a back-up story to Jim Lee's hugely successful Deathblow comic series.

Death
Manabat died after losing his battle with Hodgkin's lymphoma in 1995.

References

External links
 2005 Tribute to Nick Manabat
 Comic Vine Entry for Nick Manabat
 Nick Manabat in Philippine Comics

1972 births
1995 deaths
Filipino comics artists
Kapampangan people
20th-century Filipino male artists
Deaths from Hodgkin lymphoma
Deaths from cancer in the Philippines
Hong Kong emigrants to the Philippines